Sporting Clube de Portugal is a rugby team based in Lisbon, Portugal. During the 2012/13 season, they played in the II Divisão (2nd Division-3rd Portuguese tier) of the Campeonato Nacional de Rugby (National Championship), ending the season as 2nd division champions and winning promotion to the 1ª Divisão" (1st Division-2nd Portuguese tier) for the 2013/2014 season.

Portuguese rugby union teams
Sporting CP sports